Mind of Mystikal is a re-release of the debut studio album by New Orleans based rapper Mystikal. It was released on October 10, 1995, by Jive Records and Bertelsmann Music Group. The album was certified Gold in 1998.

Track listing

Charts

Weekly charts

Year-end charts

Certifications

References

 

1995 albums
Mystikal albums
Jive Records albums